

Men's events

Women's events

Medal table

Events at the 1991 Pan American Games
Fencing at the Pan American Games
International fencing competitions hosted by Cuba
1991 in fencing